Newcastle-under-Lyme Rural District was a rural district in the county of Staffordshire. It was formed in 1894 with the civil parishes of Ashley, Audley Rural, Balterley, Betley, Chapel and Hill Chorlton, Clayton, Keele, Madeley, Maer, Mucklestone, Tyrley and Whitmore. It was abolished in 1974, by virtue of the Local Government Act 1972, when it was absorbed into the Borough of Newcastle-under-Lyme.

References
A Vision of Britain – Newcastle-under-Lyme

Borough of Newcastle-under-Lyme
History of Staffordshire
Local government in Staffordshire
Districts of England created by the Local Government Act 1894
Districts of England abolished by the Local Government Act 1972
Rural districts of England